Roberto Bertolini (born 10 September 1985) is a javelin thrower from Italy.

He won the javelin throwing competition in the Italian Athletics Championships of 2008, 2009, 2010, and 2015, and has represented his country many times internationally.

Life
Bertolini won a total of four national titles during his career. He set his personal best (81.05 metres) on 18 June 2016 in Nembro and this is the third italian best performance of all-time. He has 5 caps in national team.

Career

Achievements

National titles
Roberto Bertolini has won 4 times for the individual national championships.
4 wins in javelin throw (2008, 2009, 2010 and 2015)

See also
 Italian all-time lists - Javelin throw

References

External links
 

1985 births
Living people
Italian male javelin throwers
Athletics competitors of Fiamme Oro
Athletes (track and field) at the 2018 Mediterranean Games
Mediterranean Games silver medalists for Italy
Mediterranean Games medalists in athletics